Hartonymus is a genus of beetles in the family Carabidae, containing the following species:

Hartonymus alternatus (Leconte, 1863)
Hartonymus hoodi Casey, 1914

References

Harpalinae